Colpi di fortuna is a 2013 Italian comedy film directed by Neri Parenti.

Cast

References

External links

2013 films
Films directed by Neri Parenti
2010s Italian-language films
2013 comedy films
Italian comedy films
2010s Italian films